Ashkenazy is a Jewish surname.  Notable people with the name include:
 Ben Ashkenazy (born 1968/69), American billionaire real estate developer
 Dimitri Ashkenazy, (born 1969), clarinetist
 Severyn Ashkenazy (born 1936), American hotelier and philanthropist
 Vladimir Ashkenazy, (born 1937), pianist and conductor
 Vovka Ashkenazy, (born 1961), pianist and teacher

Businesses
 Ashkenazy Acquisition, a private real estate investment firm

See also
 Ashkenazi (surname)

References

Jewish surnames
Surnames of Russian origin
Yiddish-language surnames